Typhoon Doksuri, known in the Philippines as Tropical Storm Maring, was a strong typhoon that mostly impacted the Philippines and Vietnam during mid-September 2017. Forming as the nineteenth named storm of the season, Doksuri developed as a weak tropical depression over to the east of Visayas on September 10.

Meteorological history

During the next day, the Japan Meteorological Agency (JMA) classified the system as a weak tropical depression. On 21:00 UTC of September 11, the JTWC followed suit, giving the designation of 21W. The JMA upgraded 21W to a tropical storm during September 12, giving the name Doksuri, the nineteenth named storm of the annual typhoon season. By September 13, robust convection had persisted near its low-level circulation center (LLCC) along with deep convective banding and a depicted "ragged" microwave eye feature. This prompted the JTWC to classify Doksuri as a tropical storm. About six hours later, Doksuri's LLCC became well-defined, and Doksuri strengthened into a severe tropical storm from the JMA.

By September 14, strong convection was found to the south of its LLCC as convective banding began to wrap into a nascent eye. Doksuri strengthened into a Category 1-equivalent typhoon. The JMA followed suit on upgrading Doksuri to a typhoon on 12:00 UTC of the same day. With a slowly-developing eye with constant convection around its LLCC, Doksuri strengthened into a Category 2-equivalent typhoon.

Preparations and impact

Philippines

Doksuri, which is known as Maring, affected the Philippine archipelago of Luzon as a tropical storm. Shortly after when PAGASA began monitoring on the system, they already raised a Storm Signal Warning #1 over in the Southern Luzon portion, including provinces of Camarines Sur and Aurora on September 11. Hours later, Signal Warning #1 was expanded to as west as Metro Manila, as north as Pangasinan and La Union, while every province in Central Luzon (Region III) was in that area. Moreover, local government units declared class suspensions to many places, especially in the capital region and the province of Bulacan for Tuesday, September 12. Domestics flights were already canceled from Ninoy Aquino International Airport while bus trips were canceled in the Quezon-Aurora area. After the storm, on September 13, officials in the Cordillera Administrative Region (CAR) had warned residents to refrain from doing outdoor activities over in mountainous areas, especially in Benguet, for possibilities of landslides.

Laguna was one of the provinces that got hit hard by the storm as the city was placed under a state of calamity after it had "too much rainfall" that produced further flash floods and landslides. Malacañang had provided ₱650 million (US$12.8 million) worth of relief goods and funds for victims while the Department of Health (DoH) had offered ₱20 million (US$393,000) of supplies for provinces from Cagayan Valley (Region II) down to Bicol (Region V). Over in the Quezon province, three buses and a car were stranded in flooded streets and the 25 passengers in one bus were rescued later that day. Quezon officials deployed rescue boats and military trucks the rescue efforts while the Philippine Army's 2nd Infantry Division has deployed a rescue team in Calabarzon. About 1,857 families or 7,549 people were staying in 116 evacuation centers over in Laguna and Quezon. At least 2,103 families or 8,794 persons were affected in 109 barangays in the regions of Central Luzon, Metro Manila and the Calabarzon. The Department of Social Welfare and Development (DSWD) allocated a total of ₱577.8 million (US$11.3 million) as standby funds for affected families while 18,000 food packs were prepositioned.

According to the NDRRMC, a total of 22 people were dead with 4 missing, while damage nationwide were at ₱267 million (US$5.24 million).

Vietnam
Typhoon Doksuri was the tenth storm to affect Vietnam and considered it as the "most powerful storm in a decade". As early as September 13, authorities over the northern and central provinces banned from going to sea. Vietnam was placed under a red warning, which stands for "very high" risks. Coastal provinces, therefore, announced plans to shut down beaches and ban fishing by September 14. The Red Cross Society has sent missions to Ha Tinh and Quang Binh and mobilized forces to support people in storm-hit areas during September 15. About 1,500 villagers were evacuated over in the Thua Thien-Hue province due to water erosion. In Vietnam's capital city of Hanoi, 33 flights were canceled, while Vietnam Railways canceled seven passenger trains and five cargo trains in the Ha Tinh and Quang Binh provinces. About 80,000 people have evacuated over in Central Vietnam.

Water erosion affected 700 meters of sea dike in a village in Thuan An. Seven fishing vessels and 183 small boats sank while 10 small irrigation dams were damaged. 220 small boats were washed away over in the provinces of Nam Dinh and Quang Ngai. In agriculture, Doksuri affected 4,473 hectares of rice with an additional 8,277 hectares for other crops, as well as 16,108 hectares of aquaculture. Overall, 13,000 hectares of perennial crops were damaged, mostly over in the Quang Binh and Quang Tri provinces. The storm also damaged a total of 10 km of highways and 17.9 km of local roads. A total of 23,968 houses had damaged roofs, especially from the Ha Tinh province. During September 16, Vietnam Electricity resumed power only to seriously affected areas such as Dong Hoi, Quang Binh and Nghe An. On September 17, the Vietnam Red Cross (VRC) offered aid of about ₫1.5 billion (US$66,000) to six provinces that were hit by the typhoon. Moreover, the Coca-Cola company of Vietnam sent 24,000 water bottles to residents of in the Quang Binh province. Around the same time, 31,000 soldiers and police were mobilized to help residents in hard-hit provinces. By September 19, a total of 1.3 million households had been supplied with electricity again. On the same day, the FLC Group provide a relief of ₫9 billion (US$396,000) to Nghe An, Ha Tinh and Quang Binh for the recovery of Doksuri.

In all, 12 people were reported to be dead during the typhoon, along with 215 injury and 4 missing. Total damages from the typhoon reached ₫18.4 trillion (US$809 million). Quang Binh and Ha Tinh were the worst hit provinces, which lost a total of ₫13.86 trillion (US$610 million). Vietnam Electricity suffered a loss of ₫215 billion (US$9.46 million), while damage on the health sector reached ₫50 billion (US$2.2 million).

Other areas
Despite making landfall in Indochina, Doksuri affected Hainan and total economic losses were estimated to be CNY100 million (US$15.3 million). Flooding triggered by the storm in Laos killed one person and total damage reached ₭55.5 billion  (US$6.68 million).

See also

Weather of 2017
Tropical cyclones in 2017
Typhoon Dan (1989)
Tropical Storm Lekima (2007)
Typhoon Wutip (2013)
 Tropical Depression Winnie
Typhoon Ketsana (2009) similar path and intensity

References

External links

JMA General Information of Typhoon Doksuri (1719) from Digital Typhoon

21W.DOKSURI from the U.S. Naval Research Laboratory

2017 Pacific typhoon season
2017 disasters in the Philippines
Typhoons in the Philippines
Typhoons in Vietnam
2017 disasters in Vietnam
Doksuri